Bartlow Township is one of the thirteen townships of Henry County, Ohio, United States. As of the 2010 census the population was 2,367, of whom 568 lived in the unincorporated portion of the township.

Geography
Located in the southeastern corner of the county, it borders the following townships:
Richfield Township - north
Milton Township, Wood County - northeast corner
Jackson Township, Wood County - east
Pleasant Township, Hancock County - southeast corner
Van Buren Township, Putnam County - south
Liberty Township, Putnam County - southwest corner
Marion Township - west
Monroe Township - northwest corner

It is the only county township to border Hancock County.

The village of Deshler is located in eastern Bartlow Township.

Name and history
It is the only Bartlow Township statewide, although there is a Barlow Township in Washington County.

Government
The township is governed by a three-member board of trustees, who are elected in November of odd-numbered years to a four-year term beginning on the following January 1. Two are elected in the year after the presidential election and one is elected in the year before it. There is also an elected township fiscal officer, who serves a four-year term beginning on April 1 of the year after the election, which is held in November of the year before the presidential election. Vacancies in the fiscal officership or on the board of trustees are filled by the remaining trustees.

Public education for the township is administered by the Patrick Henry Local School District.

References

External links
County website

Townships in Henry County, Ohio
Townships in Ohio